Minuscule 361 (in the Gregory-Aland numbering), ε 316 (Soden), is a Greek minuscule manuscript of the New Testament, on parchment. Paleographically it has been assigned to the 13th century. 
It was adapted for liturgical use. 
It is known as Codex de Rossi 1.

Description 

The codex contains the text of the four Gospels on 186 parchment leaves with lacunae (Luke 8:14-11:20). It is written in one column per page, in 20 lines per page.

Text 

The Greek text of the codex is a representative of the Byzantine text-type. Hermann von Soden classified it to the textual family Kr. Aland placed it in Category V.
It belongs to the textual family Kr in Luke 1 and Luke 20. In Luke 10 the manuscript is defective.

History 

The manuscript once belonged to J. B. de Rossi. The manuscript was added to the list of New Testament manuscripts by Scholz (1794–1852). 
It was fully described (as also minuscule 360) by De Rossi in his Catalogue. It was examined by Burgon. C. R. Gregory saw it in 1886.

The manuscript is currently housed at the Biblioteca Palatina in Parma (Ms. Parm. 1821).

See also 

 List of New Testament minuscules
 Biblical manuscript
 Textual criticism

References

Further reading 

 

Greek New Testament minuscules
13th-century biblical manuscripts